The following is a list of notable people who have dyslexia.

A 

 Eric Adams (born 1960) American politician and New York City mayor 
 Maggie Aderin-Pocock (born 1968), British space scientist and science educator.
 Muhammad Ali (1942–2016; aged 74), American professional boxer and heavyweight champion of the world.
 Sam Allardyce (born 1954), English footballer and football manager
 Jennifer Aniston (born 1969), American actress (Friends, Marley & Me, We're the Millers, The Morning Show).
 Louise Arnold (born 1972), English children's book author.
 Michael Attree (born 1965), English satirical writer and comedian.

B 

Mel B (born 1975), English singer (Spice Girls)
Abhishek Bachchan (born 1976), Indian Bollywood actor.
Ann Bancroft (born 1955), American arctic explorer.
Geoff Barrow (born 1971), English musician.
Princess Beatrice (born 1988), member of the British Royal Family and ninth in line of succession to the British throne.
BENEE (born 2000), New Zealand singer-songwriter.
Michael Bennet (born 1964), American politician and United States Senator from Colorado.
Robert Benton (born 1932), American screenwriter and film director.
Sebastian Bergne (born 1966), British industrial designer.
Jay Blades (born 1970), British furniture restorer and television presenter.
Melanie Blake (born 1976), English talent agent and author.
Orlando Bloom (born 1977), English actor (The Lord of the Rings, The Hobbit, Pirates of the Caribbean).
David Boies (born 1941), American lawyer and chairman.
Roberto Bolaño (1953–2003; aged 50), Chilean novelist and poet.
Jeremy Bonderman (born 1982), American baseball player.
Chaz Bono (born 1969), American advocate, writer, musician and actor.
Danny Boome (born 1976), chef, athlete and health enthusiast.
Lara Flynn Boyle (born 1970), American actress (Twin Peaks, Wayne's World, Red Rock West, Men in Black II).
Sir Richard Branson (born 1950), English entrepreneur, billionaire and business magnate (Virgin Group).
Chrisann Brennan (born 1954), American artist and author (The Bite in the Apple).
Marcus Brigstocke (born 1973), English comedian, actor and satirist.
Nancy Brinker (born 1946), American ambassador and founder of The Promise Fund and Susan G. Komen for the Cure.
Erin Brockovich (born 1960), American legal clerk, consumer advocate and socio-environmental activist.
Max Brooks (born 1972), American actor and author.
Bad News Brown (1977–2011; aged 33), Canadian musician and hip hop MC.
Neil Bush (born 1955), American businessman and son of the 41st President of the United States George H. W. Bush.
Dame Darcey Bussell (born 1969), an English retired ballerina.
Octavia E. Butler (1947–2006; aged 58), American science fiction author.
Celine Byrne (born 1980), Irish soprano.

C 

Stephen J. Cannell (1941–2010; aged 69), American television producer, writer and novelist (The A-Team, 21 Jump Street).
Carl XVI Gustaf (born 1946), King of Sweden.
Prince Carl Philip, Duke of Värmland (born 1979), Prince of Sweden.
Dan Carter, Canadian politician.
Jim Carrey (born 1962), Canadian-American actor and comedian (The Mask, Ace Ventura, Dumb and Dumber, Liar Liar, Bruce Almighty).
Dave Chalk (born 1959), Canadian broadcaster and technology journalist.
John T. Chambers (born 1949), American businessman and CEO of Cisco
Georgina Chapman (born 1976), English fashion designer and actress.
Blake Charlton (born 1979), American science fiction author and cardiologist.
Cher (born 1946), American singer and actress ("Goddess of Pop").
Amy Childs (born 1990), English model and television personality (The Only Way Is Essex).
Sir Timothy Clifford (born 1946), British art historian.
Gary Cohn (born 1960), American business leader.
Jason Conley (born 1981), American basketball player.
Pete Conrad (1930–1999; aged 69), American Apollo 12 astronaut and third man to walk on the Moon.
Anderson Cooper (born 1967), American broadcast journalist and political commentator.
Barbara Corcoran (born 1949), American businesswoman, investor, syndicated columnist, and television personality.
Chris Cosentino (born 1972), American celebrity chef and television personality (Top Chef Masters, The Next Iron Chef).
Toby Cosgrove (born 1940), American Vietnam War veteran and former heart surgeon.
Tom Cruise (born 1962), American actor (Top Gun, Mission Impossible, War of the Worlds, Knight and Day).

D 

Clark Janell Davis (born 1997), American model and Miss Kentucky 2015.
John de Lancie (born 1948), American actor and comedian (Star Trek, Days of Our Lives, Stargate SG-1).
Samuel R. Delany (born 1942), African-American science fiction author and literary critic.
Patrick Dempsey (born 1966), American actor (Grey's Anatomy, Outbreak, Enchanted).
Paul Dewar (1963–2019; aged 56), Canadian educator and politician.
Walt Disney (1901–1966; aged 65), American animator, film producer and entrepreneur. His dyslexia is disputed.
Nadine Dorries (born 1957), British politician who served as Secretary of State for Digital, Culture, Media and Sport (2021–2022).
Jacques Dubochet (born 1942), Swiss biophysicist.
Michael Dudikoff (born 1954), American actor (Bounty Hunters, American Ninja 2: The Confrontation).

E 

Arjan Ederveen (born 1956), Dutch actor and comedian.
Asli Enver (born 1984), Turkish actress.
Albert Einstein (1879–1955; aged 76), German-born theoretical physicist. His dyslexia is disputed.
Fae Ellington (born 1953), Jamaican media personality and lecturer.
Ari Emanuel (born 1961), American businessman and CEO of Endeavor.
Emma-Claire Fierce (born 1990), French writer.

F 

Paloma Faith (born 1981), English singer-songwriter and actress ("Upside Down", "Only Love Can Hurt Like This", "Picking Up the Pieces", "Changing", "Lullaby", St Trinian's).
Alexander Faludy (born 1983), English Reverend and the youngest Cambridge undergraduate for 200 years.
Steve Fielding (born 1960), Australian politician.
Fannie Flagg (born 1944), American actress, comedian and author.
Ben Fogle (born 1973), English television presenter, writer and adventurer.
Dave Foley (born 1963), Canadian comedian and actor.
Richard Ford (born 1944), American author (Independence Day, The Lay of the Land).

G 

Noel Gallagher (born 1967), English musician and singer-songwriter (Oasis, Noel Gallagher's High Flying Birds).
Karina Galvez (born 1964), Ecuadorian-American poet and television and radio personality.
Sally Gardner (born 1954), English children's book author and illustrator.
Gayle (born 2004), American singer ("ABCDEFU").
Whoopi Goldberg (born 1955), American actress, comedian and television personality (Ghost, Sister Act, The Lion King, Toy Story 3, The View).
Alison Goldfrapp (born 1966), English musician and record producer (Goldfrapp).
Terry Goodkind (1948–2020; aged 72), American writer (The Sword of Truth, The Law of Nines).
Frank Gore (born 1983), American football player.
Mike Gravel (1930–2021; aged 91), American politician and former United States Senator from Alaska (1969–1981).
Allan Gray (1938–2019; aged 81), South African investor, billionaire businessman and philanthropist.
Olive Gray (born 1994), English actress (Half Moon Investigations, Save Me).
Brian Grazer (born 1951), American film and television producer and writer.

H 

 Sir Lewis Hamilton (born 1985), British racing driver (Formula One).
 Matt Hancock (born 1978), British politician who served as Secretary of State for Health and Social Care (2018–2021).
 Maya Hawke (born 1998), American actor, model and singer-songwriter.
Salma Hayek (born 1966), Mexican actress (Teresa, From Dusk till Dawn, Wild Wild West, House of Gucci).
Mark Henry (born 1971), American professional wrestler and powerlifter.
John Hickenlooper (born 1952), American politician and former junior U.S. Senator of Colorado.
Tommy Hilfiger (born 1951), American fashion designer and founder of Tommy Hilfiger Corporation.
John Hoke III (born ?), Chief Design Officer, Nike, Inc.
Tom Holland (born 1996), English actor (Spider-Man, The Impossible, Captain America: Civil War).
Sir Anthony Hopkins (born 1937), Welsh actor and director (The Silence of the Lambs, Hannibal, Red Dragon, The Elephant Man).
Jack Horner (born 1946), American palaeontologist.

I 

John Irving (born 1942), American novelist, short story writer and screenwriter.
Jony Ive (born 1967), English industrial and product designer and CDO for Apple.
Eddie Izzard (born 1962), British stand-up comedian, actor and activist.

J 

Caitlyn Jenner (born 1949), American media personality, retired Olympic gold medal-winning athlete and transgender activist.
Daymond John (born 1969), American businessman, investor and television personality (Shark Tank).
Colin Jones (1936–2021; aged 85), English photographer and ballet dancer.

K 

Rebecca Kamen (born 1950), American artist and sculptor.
Ingvar Kamprad (1926–2018; aged 91), Swedish industrialist, billionaire business magnate and founder of IKEA.
Paul Kanjorski (born 1937), American politician and former Member of the U.S. House of Representatives from Pennsylvania.
Mollie King (born 1987), English singer and radio presenter (The Saturdays, BBC Radio 1).
Laura Kirkpatrick (born 1989), American model and fashion designer.
Tawny Kitaen (1961–2021; aged 59), American actress, model and media personality. 
Keira Knightley (born 1985), English actress (Pirates of the Caribbean, Bend It Like Beckham, Love Actually, Pride & Prejudice).
Willem Johan Kolff (1911–2009; aged 97), Dutch physician.
David Koresh (1959–1993; aged 33), American cult leader of the Branch Davidians.

L 

LadBaby (born 1987), English YouTuber, blogger and philanthropist. His wife, Roxanne Zee Hoyle (born 1987), also has dyslexia.
Eugene Landy (1934–2006; aged 71), American psychologist.
J. F. Lawton (born 1960), American writer, producer and director (Pretty Woman, Under Siege, Chain Reaction).
Lee Kuan Yew (1923–2015; aged 91), 1st Prime Minister of Singapore.
Peter Leitch (born 1944), New Zealand businessman and philanthropist.
Angie Le Mar (born 1965), British comedian, actress and writer.
Jay Leno (born 1950), American television presenter and comedian (The Tonight Show with Jay Leno).
Tom Lewis (born 1991), English professional golfer.
Lil Pump (born 2000), American rapper ("Gucci Gang", "I Love It").
Kenny Logan (born 1972), Scottish rugby union player.
Greg Louganis (born 1960), American Olympic diver, author and LGBT rights activist.
Prince Louis of Luxembourg (born 1986), Prince of Luxembourg.

M 

Dannel Malloy (born 1955), American politician and former Governor of Connecticut (2011–2019).
Steve Mariotti (born 1953), American social entrepreneur, educator and founder of Network For Teaching Entrepreneurship.
Mireille Mathieu (born 1946), French singer.
Lee Marvin (1924–1987; aged 63), American Academy Award-winning actor (M Squad, The Killers, The Dirty Dozen).
Steve McQueen (1930–1980; aged 50), American actor (The Getaway, The Great Escape, The Towering Inferno).
Steve McQueen (born 1969), British film director (12 Years a Slave).
Kendrick Meek (born 1966), American politician and former Member of the U.S. House of Representatives from Florida.
Douglas Merrill (born 1970), American technologist and fintech entrepreneur.
M.I.A. (born 1975), British rapper and singer ("Paper Planes", "Bad Girls").
James Middleton (born 1987), English entrepreneur and brother of Catherine, Princess of Wales.
Mika (born 1983), Lebanese-born English singer-songwriter ("Grace Kelly", "Big Girl (You Are Beautiful)", "Lollipop").
Alyssa Milano (born 1972), American actress (Who's the Boss?, Charmed, My Name Is Earl, Insatiable).
Jerry Moffatt (born 1963), British rock climber.
Lorin Morgan-Richards (born 1975), American author and illustrator (The Goodbye Family).
Dorrit Moussaieff (born 1950), Israeli jewellery designer and First Lady of Iceland (2003–2016).
Shlomo Moussaieff (1925–2015; aged 90), Israeli jewellery businessman and Bible expert.
Don Mullan (born 1956), Irish author, producer and humanitarian.
Róisín Murphy (born 1973), Irish singer-songwriter and record producer.
Jaime Murray (born 1976), English actress (Hustle, Dexter, Once Upon a Time).

N 

Steven Naismith (born 1986), Scottish professional footballer.
Gavin Newsom (born 1967), American politician and Governor of California.
Jace Norman (born 2000), American actor (Henry Danger).
Mike Norris (born 1961), English businessman and CEO of Computacenter.

O 

Paul Oakenfold (born 1963), English record producer, remixer and trance DJ.
Brendan O'Carroll (born 1955), Irish actor and comedian (Mrs. Brown's Boys, All Round to Mrs. Brown's, Mrs. Brown's Boys D'Movie).
Olav V of Norway (1903–1991; aged 87), King of Norway (1957–1991).
Jamie Oliver (born 1975), British chef and television presenter.
Paul Orfalea (born 1947), American entrepreneur and founder of FedEx Kinko's.
Ozzy Osbourne (born 1948), English musician and television personality (Black Sabbath, The Osbournes).

P 

Alice Pagani (born 1998), Italian actress, model and author (Baby, Loro).
Diamond Dallas Page (born 1956), American professional wrestler, actor and author.
Theo Paphitis (born 1959), Cypriot-born British businessman and retail magnate (Dragons' Den).
Nicholas Parsons (1923–2020; aged 96), English actor and presenter. 
Jean Paton (born 1929), British bryologist and botanical illustrator.
Dav Pilkey (born 1966), American author and illustrator (Captain Underpants, Dog Man).
Jerry Pinkney (1939–2021; aged 81), American illustrator and writer.
Daniel Powter (born 1971), Canadian singer-songwriter ("Bad Day").
Hal Prewitt (born 1954), American artist, photographer, entrepreneur and race car driver.

Q 

Scott Quinnell (born 1972), Welsh rugby union player.

R 

Bodo Ramelow (born 1956), German politician and Minister-President of Thuringia.
Sara Rankin, British scientist.
Robert Rauschenberg (1925–2008; aged 82), American artist.
Keanu Reeves (born 1964) Canadian actor. 
Nicolas Winding Refn (born 1970), Danish film director.
Iwan Rheon (born 1985), Welsh actor and musician (Game of Thrones, Misfits, Vicious).
Guy Ritchie (born 1968), English film director.
Chris Robshaw (born 1986), English rugby union player.
David Rockefeller (1915–2017; aged 101), American business executive and philanthropist.
Richard Rogers (1933–2021; aged 88), British architect.
Justin Roiland (born 1980), American animator and voice actor (Rick and Morty, Solar Opposites).
Kelle Roos (born 1992), Dutch professional footballer.
Louis B. Rosenberg‎ (born 1969), American engineer and businessperson.
Hans Rosling (1948–2017; aged 68), Swedish international health professor and statistician.
Mark Ruffalo (born 1967), American actor and producer (Shutter Island, The Avengers, The Normal Heart).
Rex Ryan (born 1962), American football coach and analyst (Buffalo Bills).

S 

Ronja Savolainen (born 1997), Finnish ice hockey player.
Mark Schlereth (born 1966), American football player.
Philip Schultz (born 1945), American poet and founder and director of the Writers Studio.
Charles R. Schwab (born 1937), American investor and chairman of Charles Schwab Corporation.
Tim Scott (born 1971), English guitarist.
Jo Self (born 1956), English contemporary artist and poet.
Dax Shepard (born 1975) American actor, comedian, and filmmaker. 
Peter Shumlin (born 1956), American politician and former Governor of Vermont.
Carly Simon (born 1943) American singer-songwriter, memoirist, and children's author. 
Bryan Singer (born 1965), American film director (Lion's Den, X-Men, Superman Returns, Jack the Giant Slayer).
Callum Skinner (born 1992), Scottish racing cyclist.
Neil Smith (born 1966), American football player.
Brent Sopel (born 1977), Canadian ice hockey player.
Steven Spielberg (born 1946), American film director and screenwriter (E.T. the Extra-Terrestrial, Jurassic Park, Saving Private Ryan, War Horse, War of the Worlds).
Octavia Spencer (born 1970) is an American actress. 
Glenn Stearns (born 1963), American entrepreneur and founder of Stearns Lending.
Georgia Steel (born 1998), English television personality (Love Island Series 4).
Gwen Stefani (born 1969), American singer-songwriter (No Doubt, "Hollaback Girl", "The Sweet Escape", "What You Waiting For?").
Sir Jackie Stewart (born 1939), Scottish racing driver (Formula One).
Sir David Stirling (1915–1990; aged 74), Scottish military officer and founder of the Special Air Service.
Joss Stone (born 1987), English singer ("You Had Me").
Musa Sukwene (born 1986), South Africa singer, who won the Idols South Africa in 2013.
Kristy Swanson (born 1969), American actress (Buffy the Vampire Slayer, The Phantom).
Diane Swonk (born 1962), American economic advisor and chief economist at KPMG US.

T 

Helen B. Taussig (1898–1986; aged 87), American cardiologist.
Tim Tebow (born 1987), American football player.
Bella Thorne (born 1997), American actress, singer and writer (Dirty Sexy Money, My Own Worst Enemy, The DUFF, Her & Him).
Kara Tointon (born 1983), English actress (EastEnders, Mr Selfridge).

V 

Krystal Versace (born 2001), English drag queen and winner of RuPaul's Drag Race UK (Series 3).
Victoria, Crown Princess of Sweden (born 1977), heir apparent to the Swedish throne.

W 

Lindsay Wagner (born 1949), American actress (The Bionic Woman, The Six Million Dollar Man).
Butch Walker (born 1969), American singer and record producer.
Ben Watkins (born 1957), English musician and founder of Juno Reactor.
Ben Way (born 1980), English serial entrepreneur (The Secret Millionaire, The Startup Kids).
Bob Weir (born 1947), American guitarist (Grateful Dead).
Cliff Weitzman (born 1995?)  Israeli-American entrepreneur and founder of Speechify Text To Speech software. 
Willard Wigan (born 1957), English sculptor.
Mark Wilkinson (1950–2017; aged 66), English furniture designer.
Toyah Willcox (born 1958), English singer and actress ("It's a Mystery", "Thunder in the Mountains", "I Want to Be Free").
Robbie Williams (born 1974), English singer-songwriter (Take That, "Angels", "Candy", "She's the One").
Robin Williams (1951–2014; aged 63), American actor and comedian (Mrs. Doubtfire, Jumanji, Night at the Museum).
Holly Willoughby (born 1981), English television presenter (This Morning, Dancing on Ice, Celebrity Juice).
Justin Wilson (1978–2015; aged 37), British professional open-wheel racing driver (Formula One).
Henry Winkler (born 1945), American actor (Happy Days) and spokesman for The Dyslexia Foundation.
Joshua Wong (born 1996), Hong Kong activist and protester.
Bethan Laura Wood (born 1983), English jewellery, furniture and decorative object designer.
Dominic Wood (born 1978), English radio and television presenter, entertainer and magician (Dick and Dom, BBC Radio 1).

Y 

 Michael Young (born 1966), British industrial designer and creative director.

Z 

Benjamin Zephaniah (born 1958), British writer and dub poet.

Notes

Lists of people with disabilities
List

Psychology lists